"El Negro Zumbón" (also known as "Anna") is a baião song written by Armando Trovajoli in 1951 for the film Anna, directed by Alberto Lattuada and starring Silvana Mangano.

In the movie, the song is performed in a night club scene by Mangano, though she is lip-syncing; the lyrics are actually sung by Flo Sandon's.

After the U.S. release of Anna in 1953, the Brazilian beat of "El Negro Zumbón" influenced American Pop music. It has also been recorded by many Latin American artists.

Notable recordings and versions
 Pérez Prado (1950s)
 Amália Rodrigues (1953)
 Caterina Valente with Silvio Francesco (1956)
 Abbe Lane with Tito Puente (1957)
 Edmundo Ros (1960s) - Mambo no.5
 Connie Francis (1961)
 Gene Ammons (1963)
 Bob Crewe (1967)
 Juan García Esquivel
 Chet Atkins (1967)
 Imca Marina (1988)
 Regina Do Santos (1995)
 Pink Martini (2004) - vocals by China Forbes, Timothy Nishimoto, and Dan Faehnle
 Nojazz (2005)
 Haruomi Hosono (2017)

Posterity
A clip of the opening of this performance is featured in the film Cinema Paradiso (1988).

In Caro diario (1993), Nanni Moretti dances on a clip of this song broadcast on a TV set.

A sample of the song is used by the band The Avalanches at the end of their track Frontier Psychiatrist, from their 2000 album Since I Left You.

The song can also be heard in the background in a diner in Martin Scorsese's "The Irishman".

Notes
 IMDb as well as the Pink Martini liner notes credit this song to Roman Vatro (music) - one of the multiple alternate names of Armando Trovajoli - and Francesco Giordano (lyrics).

References

External links
 

 

1951 songs
Samba songs